Holland Arms railway station was situated on the Anglesey Central Railway line from Gaerwen to Amlwch. Located in the village of Pentre Berw it was known as Holland Arms because of the well known hotel of the same name in the village. It also served as the junction of the Red Wharf Bay branch line from 1908 onwards.

The original platform was on the Down (west) side of the track and had a wooden building containing a waiting room and ticket office on it. This was replaced by a stone building in 1882. There was also a small goods yard on the down side, just north of the platform. In 1908 to serve the new branch line a second platform with stone building was erected on the Up side (east).

When the Red Wharf Bay branch closed to all traffic in 1950, there was little traffic at Holland Arms, and the station closed in 1952, the first on the Anglesey Central line to do so. Only one platform survives and the station building survives too. The single track goes past the station, towards Gaerwen, one way, and Amlwch the other way.

References

Further reading

Disused railway stations in Anglesey
Railway stations in Great Britain opened in 1865
Railway stations in Great Britain closed in 1952
Llanfihangel Ysgeifiog
Former London and North Western Railway stations
1865 establishments in Wales
1952 disestablishments in Wales